Giuseppe Poggi (3 April 1811 – 19 March 1901) was an Italian architect, mainly active in Tuscany.

Biography
A native of Florence, he received numerous commissions from the city's upper bourgeoisie for renovations of palaces and gardens.

From 1864 he designed the city's urban renovation, which included the demolition of the walls, and the creation of the Viali di Circonvallazione to encircle the city. At the sites of the former gates of the city, he created scenographic squares, such as the Piazza Cesare Beccaria and the Piazza della Libertà. He later designed the viale dei Colli, a panoramic walk ending with the Piazzale Michelangelo.

He died at Florence in 1901.

1811 births
1901 deaths
19th-century Italian architects
Architects from Florence
Italian urban planners